Ballaghmore may refer to:
Ballaghmore, County Laois, a small village in County Laois, Ireland
Ballaghmore Castle, a castle from 1480 in Ballaghmore, County Laois
Ballaghmore (Ballymoney), a townland in County Antrim, Northern Ireland
Ballaghmore (Dunluce), a townland in County Antrim, Northern Ireland
Ballaghmore, County Carlow, a townland in County Carlow, Ireland
Ballaghmore, County Fermanagh, a townland in County Fermanagh, Northern Ireland